Lara Lettice Johnson-Wheeler (born 12 June 1993) is a British arts and fashion journalist. She is the daughter of former British Prime Minister Boris Johnson and his second wife Marina Wheeler.

Early life and education
Johnson-Wheeler was born on 12 June 1993 to Boris Johnson and Marina Wheeler.
She was educated at Bedales School, followed by the University of St Andrews where she earned a degree in Latin and Comparative Literature.

Career
Johnson-Wheeler was the feature editor at SHOWstudio for two years, and has contributed to Tatler and Vogue.

She appeared on the front cover of the September 2021 edition of Tatler, modelling Rigby & Peller shapewear in a feature about body positivity.

References

1993 births
Living people
British fashion journalists
Alumni of the University of St Andrews
People educated at Bedales School
English people of Circassian descent
English people of German descent
English people of French descent
English people of Turkish descent
English people of Lithuanian-Jewish descent
English people of Russian-Jewish descent
British people of Indian descent
Children of prime ministers of the United Kingdom
Daughters of national leaders
Boris Johnson family